Tyumen Legion is an ice hockey team in Tyumen, Russia. Founded in 2012, they play in the Russian Minor Hockey League. The team plays its home games at the Sports Palace Tyumen.

External links
Team profile at Elite Hockey Prospects

2012 establishments in Russia
Ice hockey clubs established in 2012
Ice hockey teams in Russia
Junior Hockey League (Russia) teams